The Waltz Road–Huron River Bridge is an automobile bridge located on  Waltz Road spanning the Huron River in Huron Township, Michigan. It was listed on the National Register of Historic Places in 2000.

History
The Waltz Road–Huron River Bridge was constructed in 1924 by the Wayne County Road Commission at a cost of $65,000.  The bridge replaced a previous footbridge that had been erected over the Huron River to allow local children to attend school.  The substructure was built by Swingle & Robinson, contractors from Wyandotte, Michigan, and the superstructure by  the Mt. Vernon Bridge Company from Mt. Vernon, Ohio.

On June 1, 2017, the Roads Division at the Wayne County Department of Public Services closed the bridge for repairs.  It reopened on June 3, 2019. On August 23, 2017, the Department of Public Services released the news that the 93-year-old bridge would be replaced rather than repaired. Wayne County awarded the bridge reconstruction contract to Toebe Construction, LLC of Wixom.

Description
The span consists of two identical seven-panel, camelback Pratt pony trusses. Sidewalks are attached to the outside of each truss; the railings were originally concrete balustrades with urn-shaped spindles, but these have been replaced with angles with bar spindles. Solid concrete parapets line the approaches at each end of the bridge.

Images

See also

References

External links
New Boston Bridge, "Waltz Road Bridge" from HistoricBridges.org: Multiple photographs of the bridge

Road bridges on the National Register of Historic Places in Michigan
Bridges completed in 1924
Bridges in Wayne County, Michigan
National Register of Historic Places in Wayne County, Michigan
Pratt truss bridges in the United States
Metal bridges in the United States
Huron River (Michigan)